Novhorodka is an urban-type settlement in Kropyvnytskyi Raion of Kirovohrad Oblast in Ukraine. It is located on the Kamianka, a left tributary of the Inhul in the drainage basin of the Southern Bug. Novhorodka hosts the administration of Novhorodka settlement hromada, one of the hromadas of Ukraine. Population: 

Until 18 July 2020, Novhorodka was the administrative center of Novhorodka Raion. The raion was abolished in July 2020 as part of the administrative reform of Ukraine, which reduced the number of raions of Kirovohrad Oblast to four. The area of Novhorodka Raion was merged into Kropyvnytskyi Raion.

Economy

Transportation
The settlement is on Highway H23 connecting Kropyvnytskyi and Kryvyi Rih.

There is infrequent passenger traffic.

References

Urban-type settlements in Kropyvnytskyi Raion